The Rev. George Ernest Newsom (24 May 1871 - 15 February 1934) was an Anglican clergyman and academic, Master of Selwyn College, Cambridge, 1928–1934, and Chaplain to the King (George V).  He was also  Professor of Pastoral Theology at King's College, London, 1903–1917, and Vice-Principal of King's College, London 1897–1903.

He is buried in the Parish of the Ascension Burial Ground in Cambridge.

External links

References 

 ‘NEWSOM, Rev. George Ernest’, Who Was Who, A & C Black, an imprint of Bloomsbury Publishing plc, 1920–2008; online edn, Oxford University Press, Dec 2007 accessed 7 March 2013

1871 births
1934 deaths
Masters of Selwyn College, Cambridge
Academics of King's College London
Chaplains of King's College London